Scheibreen is a glacier in Albert I Land at Spitsbergen, Svalbard. It is located on Reuschhalvøya, and debouches into Scheibukta, a southern bay of Smeerenburgfjorden. The glacier is named after geologist Per Schei.

See also
List of glaciers in Svalbard

References

Glaciers of Spitsbergen